The Airbus CC-150 Polaris is the designation for the civilian Airbus A310-300s which have been converted into multi-purpose, long-range jet aircraft for passenger, freight or medical transport and mid-air refueling for the Royal Canadian Air Force.

Design and development
The five Airbus aircraft that make up the fleet were originally civilian airliners purchased and operated by Wardair. First delivered in 1987 and 1988, they were transferred to Canadian Airlines when the two airlines merged in 1989. The aircraft were subsequently sold to the Canadian Armed Forces and converted for military use, entering service between December 1992 and August 1993. Four of the five aircraft were converted to the Combi-Freighter standard with a reinforced floor and side opening cargo door. The fifth was modified as a VIP transport aircraft for government executive transport.

The CC-150 replaced the Boeing CC-137 (converted Boeing 707) as a strategic transport when the final transport-configured CC-137s were retired in 1997.

Tanker conversion

In 2008, two of the five CC-150s were converted to air-to-air refuelling tankers with a new military mission avionics package for the CF-18 fleet as part of the Multi Role Tanker Transport (MRTT) program. The Polaris tankers are capable of ferrying a flight of four CF-18 Hornets non-stop across the Atlantic Ocean, off-loading 80,000 pounds of fuel to the receiving aircraft over a 2,500 nautical mile (4,630 km) leg. The MRTT program was initiated because of a German Air Force requirement and provided a cost-effective solution for the Canadian Forces. The converted aircraft have been designated CC-150T. The tankers have hose-drogue pods under the wings.

The RCAF uses converted C-130s, RCAF designation CC-130H(T), for tactical air-to-air refuelling but is limited when deploying CF-18s overseas, as they are better served by a strategic AAR platform. As a result of the CC-150's MRTT conversion, Canada regained its strategic air-to-air refuelling capability, lost when the final tanker-configured CC-137s were retired in 1997 (13703 & 13704 were modified with Beech refuelling kits in mid-1972 in support of the CF-5 tactical fighter).

The first converted CC-150T completed its acceptance trials in May 2008.

Operational history
The Polaris is classified as a strategic airlifter by the Royal Canadian Air Force. As a tanker, the CC-150 has a similar fuel capacity to the KC-135; it is more flexible because of the large cabin, offering good capacity for cargo, troop transport, VIP transport or other uses, but lacks the oversize cargo capacity and ability to operate from austere locations. The Canadian Armed Forces rely on other heavy lift cargo aircraft (such as the C-17 Globemaster) for these kinds of operations.

The five CC-150s are operated by 437 Transport Squadron at CFB Trenton, Ontario. They served in United Nations, Red Cross and NATO initiatives, including operations in Afghanistan.

In 2011, two CC-150T air-to-air refuelling tankers were deployed to support Canadian CF-18 fighter jets enforcing the no-fly zone over Libya under Operation Mobile and Operation Unified Protector.

The initial purchase from Canadian Airlines in 1992 included a support contract for service of the aircraft for a fixed number of flying hours. Air Canada acquired the CC-150 service contract when it purchased Canadian Airlines in 2000, and through a series of subsequent corporate restructurings, spawned the CC-150 service contract to Air Canada Technical Services (ACTS), then Aveos Fleet Performance. Following the collapse of Aveos Fleet Performance in March 2012, the Government of Canada awarded a one-year interim contract to L3 Communications to support the fleet of CC-150 aircraft until Canada could award a longer term aircraft maintenance contract through a competitive procurement process.

Use as VIP transport
The decision to outfit one of the five CC-150s as a VIP transport intended for use by the Prime Minister of Canada, made while Brian Mulroney held office, was politically controversial. The $56 million in upgrades were criticized as a needless extravagance during a time of government budgetary challenges by then-Leader of the Opposition Jean Chrétien, who labelled the aircraft a "flying Taj Mahal". Chrétien became Prime Minister soon thereafter and tried and failed to sell the aircraft; he refused to use the CC-150 during his ensuing 11 years in office. The interior was downgraded to a smaller, less lavish VIP cabin and the aircraft offered limited communications capability.

Subsequent refits to and from use as a troop transport resulted in much of the VIP amenities being downgraded. The CC-150 returned to use as official transport for the prime minister under Paul Martin in 2004.

In 2011, it emerged that since early 2009 the office of Prime Minister Stephen Harper had repeatedly requested that the VIP-configured CC-150, aircraft #01, be repainted from the gun-metal military paint scheme it shared with the other CC-150s to a specialized paint scheme. The Department of National Defence, including Minister Peter MacKay, had resisted this request, noting that it was contrary to its multi-role nature and would compromise the aircraft's potential to safely transport personnel into a combat zone. The decision was ultimately made to repaint the craft during its next scheduled maintenance around 2012.

In 2013, the VIP-configured CC-150 was repainted during scheduled heavy maintenance at a cost of $50,000. The new scheme, predominantly white with significant quantities of blue and smaller amounts of red, was criticized heavily by opposition politicians, who alleged the repainting was intended to give prominence to the then-governing Conservative Party of Canada's traditional blue colour. Its call sign is known officially as CAN Force One.

In recent years, various mechanical problems have occurred. In October 2016, a flap issue forced the aircraft to return to Ottawa 30 minutes after takeoff while Trudeau was en route to Belgium to sign the Canada Europe free trade deal. In March 2018, Prime Minister Trudeau's trip to India was delayed because of a mechanical issue during a refuelling stop in Rome.

In December 2019, the VIP CC-150 suffered significant structural damage to the nose and right engine cowling. While being towed by contracted personnel at CFB Trenton, it rolled into the back wall of a hangar. The aircraft was scheduled to remain out of service until August 2020, but the grounding was extended due to the effects of the COVID-19 pandemic. It was returned to service in March 2021.

Replacement
In 2021 the Government of Canada began an effort to replace all five CC-150 Polaris aircraft. The replacement tender is expected to cost US$5 billion. Early bid candidates included the Airbus A330 MRTT and the Boeing KC-46, but the latter has since been dropped.
On July 14 2022, Canada announced that it has finalized a contract to acquire two A330-200 aircraft as the first two aircraft for the Royal Canadian Air Force (RCAF) that will provide a strategic transport and air-to-air refuelling role — currently fulfilled by the fleet of five CC-150 Polaris aircraft — as part of the Strategic Tanker Transport Capability (STTC) project. The two A330 aircraft are civilian airframes from International Airfinance Corporation.

Variants
CC-150 
 1 VIP transport
 2 strategic airlifters
CC-150T 
 2 aerial refuelling tankers/strategic airlifters

Operators

 Royal Canadian Air Force (5)
 437 Transport Squadron

Specifications

See also

References

External links

 
 Canadian American Strategic Review
 GlobalSecurity.org

1990s French military transport aircraft
Air refueling
Airbus A310
Low-wing aircraft